Francis Dodds was a US politician.

Francis Dod(d)s may also refer to:

Francis Dodds (Irish Republican)
Francis Dods, Scottish rugby player

See also
Francis Dodd (disambiguation)
Dodds (surname)